D'Eon is a surname.

People with the surname include:

 d'Eon (musician), Canadian electronic musician
 Chevalier d'Éon (1728–1810), French diplomat and spy
 Dwight d'Eon (born 1978), Canadian musician

See also 
 Deon
 Dion (disambiguation)
 Eon (disambiguation)